The 2014–15 Pepperdine Waves men's basketball team represented Pepperdine University during the 2014–15 NCAA Division I men's basketball season. This was head coach Marty Wilson's fourth full season at Pepperdine and fifth including his time as interim head coach. The Waves played their home games at the Firestone Fieldhouse and were members of the West Coast Conference. They finished the season 18–14, 10–8 in WCC play to finish in fourth place. They advanced to the quarterfinals of the WCC tournament where they lost to Gonzaga. They were invited to the College Basketball Invitational where they lost in the first round to Seattle.

Previous season 
The Waves finished the season 15–16, 8–10 in WCC play to finish in fifth place. They lost in the quarterfinals of the WCC tournament to Saint Mary's.

Departures

Incoming Transfers

Recruiting Class of 2014

Recruiting Class of 2015

Roster

Schedule and results

|-
!colspan=9 style="background:#0021A5; color:#FF6200;"|Regular Season

|-
!colspan=9 style="background:#FF6200; color:#0021A5;"| WCC tournament

|-
!colspan=9 style="background:#FF6200; color:#0021A5;"| College Basketball Invitational

References

Pepperdine Waves men's basketball seasons
Pepperdine
Pepperdine
Pepperdine
Pepperdine